Warren Dawson "Pete" Rambo (November 1, 1906 – June 19, 1991) was a pitcher in Major League Baseball. He played for the Philadelphia Phillies.

Rambo was born in the Thorofare section of West Deptford Township, New Jersey.

A single in his only at-bat left Rambo with a rare MLB career batting average of 1.000.

References

External links

1906 births
1991 deaths
Major League Baseball pitchers
Philadelphia Phillies players
Salisbury Indians players
Cumberland Colts players
Baseball players from New Jersey
People from West Deptford Township, New Jersey
Sportspeople from Gloucester County, New Jersey